Lake Johnston is a lake in the Goldfields-Esperance region of the state of Western Australia.

It is also the name of the geological map of the area.

It and adjacent lakes have been referred to collectively as The Johnston Lakes.

Lake
It lies to the south of the Hyden-Norseman road, in the Shire of Dundas, and has a significant collection of named rocks near its shores:

Western side:
 Scamp Rock
 Knapp Rock
 Plover Rock

Eastern side:
 Harbutt Rock
 Thiel Rock

At the southern end of the lake the Bremer Range is at the boundary of the Dundas and Esperance shires.

Maps
The maps for the area near Lake Johnston use the name of the lake for the key term.
More recent maps are also available as datasets from Geoscience Australia.

Vegetation area
Lake Johnston area is also linked to the Boorabbin and Hyden areas in vegetation surveys and maps.

Geology
It is in an area of high interest to geologists and mine exploration companies, and adjacent to nickel deposits.

Nickel mines
The Lake Johnston Nickel Project is currently inactive.

A lake of similar size, Lake Hope, lies to the south west of Lake Johnston. The Emily Ann and Maggie Hays nickel mines lie to the north west of Lake Hope, west of Lake Johnston. The Emily Ann mine lies on the north side of the Hyden-Norseman road, while the Maggie Hays mine lies on the south side of the road.

References

Johnston